The Munster Senior Club Football Championship (known for sponsorship reasons as the AIB Munster GAA Football Senior Club Championship) is an annual Gaelic football competition for the champion clubs of each county. It has been organised by the Munster Council of the Gaelic Athletic Association since 1964.

The series of games are played during the autumn and winter months with the final usually being played in late November. The prize for the winning team is the O'Connor Cup. The championship has always been played on a straight knockout basis whereby once a team loses they are eliminated from the championship.

The Munster Championship is an integral part of the wider All-Ireland Senior Club Football Championship. The winners of the Munster final join the champions of Connacht, Leinster and Ulster in the semi-finals of the All-Ireland Senior Club Championship.

Six clubs currently participate in the Munster Championship. The title has been won at least once by 16 different teams. The all-time record-holders are Nemo Rangers who have won 17 championship titles.

The current holders are St Finbarr's.

The championship

Overview

The Munster Championship is a single elimination tournament – a team is eliminated after their first defeat. The fixtures are determined by a random draw and there is no seeding.

Each match is played as a single leg. If a match is drawn, two ten-minute periods of extra time are played. If the match is still level after extra time a replay takes place and so on until the game is won.

Format

Quarter-finals: Four teams contest this round. The two winning teams advance directly to the semi-finals. The two losing teams are eliminated from the championship.

Semi-finals: Four teams contest this round. The two winning teams advance directly to the final. The two losing teams are eliminated from the championship.

Final: The final is contested by the two semi-final winners.

Teams

Qualification

Wins listed by club

Wins listed by county

Finals listed by year

 St Finbarr's won the Munster Senior Club Football and Hurling championships in 1980 and are currently the only Munster club team to achieve this double.

Records and statistics

Final

Team

Most wins: 17:
Nemo Rangers (1972, 1974, 1975, 1978, 1981, 1983, 1987, 1988, 1993, 2000, 2001, 2002, 2005, 2007, 2010, 2017, 2019)
Most consecutive wins: 3:
Nemo Rangers (2000, 2001, 2002)
Dr Crokes (2011, 2012, 2013)
Most appearances in a final: 19:
Nemo Rangers (1972, 1974, 1975, 1977, 1978, 1981, 1983, 1987, 1988, 1993, 2000, 2001, 2002, 2005, 2007, 2010, 2015, 2017, 2019)
Most appearances in a final without losing (streak): 12
Nemo Rangers (1978, 1981, 1983, 1987, 1988, 1993, 2000, 2001, 2002, 2005, 2007, 2010)
Most defeats: 5
 Clonmel Commercials (1965, 1971, 1990, 1994, 2019)

Teams

By decade

The most successful team of each decade, judged by number of Munster Championship titles, is as follows:

 1960s: 2 for East Kerry (1965–68)
 1970s: 4 for Nemo Rangers (1972-74-75-78)
 1980s: 4 for Nemo Rangers (1981-83-87-88)
 1990s: 2 each for Dr Crokes (1990–91), Castlehaven (1994-97) and Laune Rangers (1995–96)
 2000s: 5 for Nemo Rangers (2000-01-02-05-07)
 2010s: 4 for Dr Crokes (2011-12-13-16)

Gaps

Top three longest gaps between successive championship titles:
 38 years: Austin Stacks (1976-2014)
 26 years: University College Cork (1973-1999)
 15 years: Dr Crokes (1991-2006)

Top scorers

All time

Overall

Single game

In finals

References

Senior